Anticorticosteroids or anticorticoids are drugs which oppose the actions of corticosteroids. They include:

 Antiglucocorticoids – e.g., mifepristone, ketoconazole, aminoglutethimide
 Antimineralocorticoids – e.g., spironolactone, canrenone, eplerenone

References

Antiglucocorticoids
Antimineralocorticoids